The sjörå , (lake Rå) or the Sjöfru (Mistress of the Lake) was a mythical creature of the lake, or Rå, in Swedish folklore. She is a female, humanoid water spirit. She is a  seductive creature, often featured sitting and combing her long, sweeping hair with delight, and often lures and drowns men who are unkind, unfaithful or otherwise disrespectful to her or the lake. Like all other rå (keepers) she protects her domain and awards those kind to her with good fishing luck and saves them from drowning. In wintertime she would sometimes stick her hand up from the waters. If the visitor then gave her a mitten she would thank him for his kindness with gifts or protect him in his time of need.

See also 

 Peder Jönsson, a man executed for allegedly having sex with a sjörå.

References 

Scandinavian legendary creatures
Swedish folklore
Female legendary creatures
Water spirits